The Midnight Chase is the third album by Swedish hard rock band Crucified Barbara. It was first released in Japan and Europe in 2012.

Track listing

References

External links 
Crucified Barbara Official site
Discogs

2012 debut albums
Crucified Barbara albums